Moritzberg may refer to the following places in Germany:

 Moritzberg (Hildesheim), a part of Hildesheim, Lower Saxony
 Moritzberg (Röthenbach an der Pegnitz), a hamlet of Röthenbach an der Pegnitz
 Moritzberg (Franconian Jura), a mountain in the Franconian Jura, Bavaria